Walt Jocketty (born February 19, 1951) is a baseball executive who is the Executive Adviser to the CEO of the Cincinnati Reds. Born in Minneapolis, Minnesota, he attended the University of Minnesota where he earned a bachelor's degree in business administration.  He was the General Manager of the St. Louis Cardinals from October 14, 1994 until October 3, 2007.

Oakland and Colorado
Jocketty began working for the Oakland Athletics beginning in March 1980, when he was hired by owner Charlie Finley as Director of Minor League Operations and Scouting. It was in this capacity that Jocketty took a lead role in overhauling the A's minor league system, and was also instrumental in founding the Arizona Rookie League and the Dominican Summer League. Less than five years into his time with Oakland, Jocketty was promoted to Director of Baseball Administration, a post he held the remainder of his time in Oakland. During the 1994 season Jocketty served the Colorado Rockies for a brief stint as their Assistant General Manager/Player Personnel.

The Cardinal years
Walt Jocketty was hired as General Manager of the St. Louis Cardinals on October 14, 1994. When Anheuser-Busch sold the team following the 1995 season, the new ownership chose to retain Jocketty. He was instrumental in bringing new manager Tony La Russa, whom he had worked with in Oakland, to St. Louis.

During his time as Cardinal GM, the Cardinals compiled seven National League Central Division championships (1996, 2000, 2002, 2004, 2005, 2006), two National League Championships (2004 and 2006), and one World Series Championship (2006). The Cardinals had seven straight winning seasons under Jocketty, including 100+ win seasons in 2004 and 2005. Jocketty has been named the Executive of the Year in MLB three times, in 2000, 2004, & 2010.

Jocketty was fired by the Cardinals organization on October 3, 2007. Team owner Bill DeWitt cited divisiveness in the baseball operations front office as the reason for Jocketty's dismissal.

Cincinnati Reds
Jocketty was hired as a Special Adviser to the Cincinnati Reds on January 11, 2008. Jocketty's role was to advise and assist the team in their baseball operations which includes the front office, personnel, scouting, minor and international operations and training and medical services. He was named the next General Manager of the Reds after Wayne Krivsky was fired April 23, 2008.

After the 2010 season, Jocketty was named Sporting News Executive Of Year.

After the 2015 season, he was named to the new position of President of Baseball Operations.

On December 27, 2016, he was named Executive Advisor to the CEO.

External links
Baseball America page
2004 interview
2002 news conference about the sudden death of Cardinal pitcher Darryl Kile
2008  Report naming Jocketty GM of Reds

References

1951 births
Living people
Carlson School of Management alumni
Major League Baseball general managers
St. Louis Cardinals executives
Cincinnati Reds executives